Benjamin Movsas is an American radiation oncologist.   He is chair of the Department of Radiation Oncology at the Henry Ford Cancer Institute,  Henry Ford Hospital.

Biography
Movsas was educated at Harvard University and Washington University School of Medicine (1990), He previously held the position of Vice-Chair of the Department of Radiation Oncology at the Fox Chase Cancer Center. He is also a leader in several nationwide multi-center clinical trials. Currently, he serves as Chair of the Radiation Therapy Oncology Group Quality of Life Committee and the National Patterns of Care Lung Committee within the American College of Radiology.   He serves on the board of directors of the American Society for Radiation Oncology. He is a Fellow and past president of the American Radium Society.

He is married to Tammy Z. Movsas, who also is a physician. They have four children.

References

External links
PubMed search for articles by Benjamin Movsas

American oncologists
Harvard University alumni
Washington University School of Medicine alumni
Washington University in St. Louis alumni
Living people
Year of birth missing (living people)